Paul Seitz (15 July 1897 – 22 February 1979) was a French footballer.

He spent his entire career as a footballer at Olympique de Marseille (from 1919 to 1926) and took the club to two Coupes de Frances (in 1924 as a defender and in 1926 as a goalkeeper). In 1921, he refused to play for the France national football team. He was also coach of the phocéen club in 1942.

Sources 

1897 births
1979 deaths
French footballers
French football managers
Olympique de Marseille players
Olympique de Marseille managers
Association football defenders